Fielding is an unincorporated community in Tilden Township, Cherokee County, Iowa, United States.

History
Fielding's population was 12 in 1925.

References

Unincorporated communities in Cherokee County, Iowa
Unincorporated communities in Iowa